Devonte Kasi Martin Perkins (born 21 October 1995), better known by his stage name K-Trap, is a British rapper and songwriter from South London. He is known for his prominence in the UK drill scene, releasing notable mixtapes such as The Last Whip (2017), The Re-Up (2018) and No Magic (2019). Previously K-Trap was widely known for wearing a balaclava to conceal his identity until June 2019 where he revealed his face for the first time in the music video for his single ‘Big Mood’, promoting his mixtape No Magic.

His debut studio album, Street Side Effects, was released on 13 November 2020. His mixtape collaboration with Blade Brown, Joints, was released on 25 March 2022.

Discography

Studio albums

Collaborative mixtapes

Mixtapes

Singles

As lead artist

As featured artist

Other charted and certified songs

References

People from Lambeth
Rappers from London
Living people
English male rappers
Gangsta rappers
UK drill musicians
1995 births